Russell Edison "Red" Evans (November 12, 1906 – June 14, 1982) was a pitcher in Major League Baseball playing for the Brooklyn Dodgers and Chicago White Sox.

Career
Evans started his professional career in the Mississippi Valley League in 1931. In 1935, he had a good season with the Oklahoma City Indians of the Texas League, going 24–8 with a 2.27 earned run average. This earned him a spot on the American League's White Sox the following season, but he pitched poorly and was sent back down to the minors.

In 1938, Evans had another good season, winning 21 games for the New Orleans Pelicans of the Southern Association. The Brooklyn Dodgers acquired him in the rule 5 draft that fall, and he started opening day for them in 1939. However, he got hammered that day and only started five more games that year, going 1–8 in the process. He was traded to the Boston Red Sox on September 1 and never played in the majors again.

References

External links

1906 births
1982 deaths
Major League Baseball pitchers
Brooklyn Dodgers players
Chicago White Sox players
Oklahoma City Indians players
New Orleans Pelicans (baseball) players
Chattanooga Lookouts players
Knoxville Smokies players
Baseball players from Chicago